Juan Durán Dueñas (born 8 January 2001) is a Spanish footballer who plays as a left back for CD Mirandés B.

Club career
Born in Alcalá de Henares, Madrid, Durán represented RSD Alcalá and Getafe CF as a youth. On 10 August 2020, after finishing his formation, he returned to Alcalá and was assigned to the first team in Tercera División.

Durán made his senior debut on 18 October 2020, coming on as a second-half substitute in a 1–1 home draw against AD Torrejón CF. He scored his first goals the following 5 May, netting a brace in a 2–1 away win over Real Aranjuez CF.

On 7 July 2021, Durán moved to CD Mirandés and was initially assigned to the reserves in Tercera División RFEF. He made his first team debut on 1 December 2021, coming on as a late substitute for Víctor Sanchís in a 3–0 away win over CD San Roque de Lepe, in the season's Copa del Rey.

Durán made his professional debut with the Jabatos on 27 May 2022, replacing Imanol García de Albéniz in a 5–1 home routing of CF Fuenlabrada.

References

External links

2001 births
Living people
People from Alcalá de Henares
Spanish footballers
Association football defenders
Segunda División players
Tercera División players
Tercera Federación players
RSD Alcalá players
CD Mirandés B players
CD Mirandés footballers